The Co-cathedral of Santa María de la Fuente la Mayor (Spanish: Concatedral de Santa María de la Fuente la Mayor) is a co-cathedral  located in Guadalajara, in Castile-La Mancha, Spain. It is in the Roman Catholic Diocese of Sigüenza-Guadalajara.

The building is in mudejar style.
It was declared Bien de Interés Cultural in 1941.

References 

Roman Catholic churches in Guadalajara, Spain
Former mosques in Spain
14th-century Roman Catholic church buildings in Spain
Roman Catholic cathedrals in Castilla–La Mancha
Mudéjar architecture in Castilla–La Mancha
Bien de Interés Cultural landmarks in the Province of Guadalajara